The 1987–88 UNLV Runnin' Rebels basketball team represented the University of Nevada Las Vegas in NCAA Division I men's competition in the 1985–86 season under head coach Jerry Tarkanian. The team played its home games in the Thomas & Mack Center, and was a member of the Pacific Coast Athletic Association (PCAA), now known as the Big West Conference. The Rebels won the regular season conference and PCAA tournament titles. The team finished with a record of 28–6 (15–3 PCAA) and reached the second round of the NCAA tournament.

Roster

Schedule and results

|-
!colspan=12 style=| Regular season

|-
!colspan=12 style=| PCAA tournament

|-
!colspan=12 style=| NCAA tournament

Rankings

See also
UNLV Runnin' Rebels basketball
1988 NCAA Division I men's basketball tournament

References

Unlv
UNLV Runnin' Rebels basketball seasons
Unlv
UNLV Runnin' Rebels basketball team
UNLV Runnin' Rebels basketball team